Abdagases I (Greek: Ἀβδαγάσης, epigraphically ΑΒΔΑΓΑΣΟΥ; Kharosthi: 𐨀𐨬𐨡𐨒𐨮) was an Indo-Parthian king, who ruled Gandhara and possibly over most of the Indus region from c. 46 to 60 AD. He was a nephew and successor of Gondophares, who had laid foundations for the Indo-Parthian kingdom after revolting against his Arsacid overlords in c. 19 AD. Abdagases was succeeded by Orthaghnes or Pacores.

Life 
Abdagases belonged to the House of Suren,  a prominent and influential family within the Arsacid Empire. He succeeded his uncle Gondophares as the ruler of Gandhara in c. 46 AD, whilst Orthagnes succeeded him at Drangiana and Arachosia. The figure of Abdagases is obscure; according to Gazerani, it is likely that Abdagases may have been the same person as another Abdagases, an influential and powerful Suren noble in the Arsacid Empire, who belonged to a faction of Parthian magnates that were dissatisfied with the Parthian king Artabanus II. The Parthian magnates had at first favoured a grandson of Phraates IV, also named Phraates as a better choice for king.  However, he met an abrupt death in Syria. The Parthian magnates then turned to another prince, Tiridates III, who was crowned by Abdagases.

Some of the Parthian magnates, however, were supporters of Artabanus II, due to their concern that Abdagases would become the de facto ruler of the Arsacid Empire, with Tiridates as a figurehead. As a result, Abdagases and his son Sinnacus withdrew their support from Tiridates as well. This event seems to have coincided with the declaration of independence in Sakastan by the Suren family under Gondophares. The identification of the two Abdagases figures, although supported by some scholars, nevertheless still remains indecisive, due to the lack of numismatic evidence. Abdagases ruled as king till c. 60 AD, and was succeeded by Orthagnes or Pacores.

Notes

References

Sources

External links
Coins of Abdagases

Indo-Parthian kings
1st-century monarchs in Asia
60 deaths
Year of birth unknown
1st-century Iranian people